Nephrophyllum is a monotypic genus of flowering plants belonging to the family Convolvulaceae. The only species is Nephrophyllum abyssinicum.

Its native range is Northeastern Tropical Africa.

References

Convolvulaceae
Monotypic Convolvulaceae genera